Jean-Pierre Serre (born 15 September 1926) is a French mathematician who has made contributions to algebraic topology, algebraic geometry, and algebraic number theory. He was awarded the Fields Medal in 1954, the Wolf Prize in 2000 and the inaugural Abel Prize in 2003.

Biography

Personal life
Born in Bages, Pyrénées-Orientales, France, to pharmacist parents, Serre was educated at the Lycée de Nîmes and then from 1945 to 1948 at the École Normale Supérieure in Paris. He was awarded his doctorate from the Sorbonne in 1951. From 1948 to 1954 he held positions at the Centre National de la Recherche Scientifique in Paris. In 1956 he was elected professor at the Collège de France, a position he held until his retirement in 1994. His wife, Professor Josiane Heulot-Serre, was a chemist; she also was the director of the Ecole Normale Supérieure de Jeunes Filles. Their daughter is the former French diplomat, historian and writer Claudine Monteil. The French mathematician Denis Serre is his nephew.  He practices skiing, table tennis, and rock climbing (in Fontainebleau).

Career
From a very young age he was an outstanding figure in the school of Henri Cartan, working on algebraic topology, several complex variables and then commutative algebra and algebraic geometry, where he introduced sheaf theory and homological algebra techniques. Serre's thesis concerned the Leray–Serre spectral sequence associated to a fibration. Together with Cartan, Serre established the technique of using Eilenberg–MacLane spaces for computing homotopy groups of spheres, which at that time was one of the major problems in topology.

In his speech at the Fields Medal award ceremony in 1954, Hermann Weyl gave high praise to Serre, and also made the point that the award was for the first time awarded to a non-analyst. Serre subsequently changed his research focus.

Algebraic geometry
In the 1950s and 1960s, a fruitful collaboration between Serre and the two-years-younger Alexander Grothendieck led to important foundational work, much of it motivated by the Weil conjectures. Two major foundational papers by Serre were Faisceaux Algébriques Cohérents (FAC, 1955), on coherent cohomology, and Géométrie Algébrique et Géométrie Analytique (GAGA, 1956).

Even at an early stage in his work Serre had perceived a need to construct more general and refined cohomology theories to tackle the Weil conjectures. The problem was that the cohomology of a coherent sheaf over a finite field could not capture as much topology as singular cohomology with integer coefficients.  Amongst Serre's early candidate theories of 1954–55 was one based on Witt vector coefficients.

Around 1958 Serre suggested that isotrivial principal bundles on algebraic varieties – those that become trivial after pullback by a finite étale map – are important. This acted as one important source of inspiration for Grothendieck to develop the étale topology and the corresponding theory of étale cohomology. These tools, developed in full by Grothendieck and collaborators in Séminaire de géométrie algébrique (SGA) 4 and SGA 5, provided the tools for the eventual proof of the Weil conjectures by Pierre Deligne.

Other work

From 1959 onward Serre's interests turned towards group theory, number theory, in particular Galois representations and modular forms.

Amongst his most original contributions were: his "Conjecture II" (still open) on Galois cohomology; his use of group actions on trees (with Hyman Bass); the Borel–Serre compactification; results on the number of points of curves over finite fields; Galois representations in ℓ-adic cohomology and the proof that these representations have often a "large" image; the concept of p-adic modular form; and the Serre conjecture (now a theorem) on mod-p representations that made Fermat's Last Theorem a connected part of mainstream arithmetic geometry.

In his paper FAC, Serre asked whether a finitely generated projective module over a polynomial ring is free. This question led to a great deal of activity in commutative algebra, and was finally answered in the affirmative by Daniel Quillen and Andrei Suslin independently in 1976. This result is now known as the Quillen–Suslin theorem.

Honors and awards
Serre, at twenty-seven in 1954, was and still is the youngest person ever to have been awarded the Fields Medal. He went on to win the Balzan Prize in 1985, the Steele Prize in 1995, the Wolf Prize in Mathematics in 2000, and was the first recipient of the Abel Prize in 2003. He has been awarded other prizes, such as the Gold Medal of the French National Scientific Research Centre (Centre National de la Recherche Scientifique, CNRS).

He is a foreign member of several scientific Academies (France, US, Norway, Sweden, Russia, the Royal Society, Royal Netherlands Academy of Arts and Sciences (1978), American Academy of Arts and Sciences, National Academy of Sciences, the American Philosophical Society) and has received many honorary degrees (from Cambridge, Oxford, Harvard, Oslo and others). In 2012 he became a fellow of the American Mathematical Society.

Serre has been awarded the highest honors in France as Grand Cross of the Legion of Honour (Grand Croix de la Légion d'Honneur) and Grand Cross of the Legion of Merit (Grand Croix de l'Ordre National du Mérite).

See also
 List of things named after Jean-Pierre Serre
 Multiplicity (mathematics)
 Bourbaki group — Serre joined it in the late 1940s

Bibliography

Groupes Algébriques et Corps de Classes (1959), Hermann , translated into English as 

Corps Locaux (1962), Hermann , as 

Cohomologie Galoisienne (1964) Collège de France course 1962–63, as 

Algèbre Locale, Multiplicités (1965) Collège de France course 1957–58, as

Algèbres de Lie Semi-simples Complexes (1966), as

Abelian ℓ-Adic Representations and Elliptic Curves (1968), reissue, 
Cours d'arithmétique (1970), PUF, as

Représentations linéaires des groupes finis (1971), Hermann, as

Arbres, amalgames, SL2 (1977), SMF, as 

Oeuvres/Collected Papers in four volumes (1986) Vol. IV in 2000, Springer-Verlag

 Exposés de séminaires 1950–1999  (2001), SMF,

 Correspondance Serre-Tate  (2015), edited with Pierre Colmez, SMF, 
 Finite Groups: an Introduction  (2016), Higher Education Press & International Press, 
 Rational Points on Curves over Finite Fields (2020), with contributions by E. Howe, J. Oesterlé, C. Ritzenthaler, SMF, 

A list of corrections, and updating, of these books can be found on his home page at Collège de France.

Notes

External links
 
 
 Jean-Pierre Serre, Collège de France, biography and publications.
 Jean-Pierre Serre  at the French Academy of Sciences, in French.
 Interview with Jean-Pierre Serre in Notices of the American Mathematical Society.
 An Interview with Jean-Pierre Serre by C.T. Chong and Y.K. Leong, National University of Singapore.
 How to write mathematics badly a public lecture by Jean-Pierre Serre on writing mathematics.
 Biographical page  (in French)

1926 births
Living people
People from Pyrénées-Orientales
Foreign associates of the National Academy of Sciences
20th-century French mathematicians
Abel Prize laureates
Algebraic geometers
Algebraists
École Normale Supérieure alumni
Academic staff of the École Normale Supérieure
Nicolas Bourbaki
Fields Medalists
Academic staff of the Collège de France
Foreign Members of the Royal Society
Number theorists
Topologists
University of Paris alumni
Grand Croix of the Légion d'honneur
Wolf Prize in Mathematics laureates
Members of the French Academy of Sciences
Members of the Norwegian Academy of Science and Letters
Members of the Royal Netherlands Academy of Arts and Sciences
Foreign Members of the Russian Academy of Sciences
Fellows of the American Mathematical Society
Institute for Advanced Study visiting scholars
Members of the American Philosophical Society
Members of the Royal Swedish Academy of Sciences
Research directors of the French National Centre for Scientific Research